Hipgnosis were an English art design group based in London, that specialised in creating album cover artwork for rock musicians and bands. Their commissions included work for Pink Floyd, Def Leppard,  T. Rex, the Pretty Things, Black Sabbath, Wishbone Ash, UFO, 10cc, Bad Company, Led Zeppelin, AC/DC, Scorpions, The Nice, Paul McCartney & Wings, the Alan Parsons Project, Genesis, Peter Gabriel, Electric Light Orchestra, Rainbow, Styx and Al Stewart.

Hipgnosis consisted primarily of Cambridge natives Storm Thorgerson and Aubrey Powell, and later Peter Christopherson. The group dissolved in 1983, though Thorgerson worked on album designs until his death in 2013. Powell has worked with Paul McCartney and The Who in film and video production, and is the creative director for both Pink Floyd and lead guitarist David Gilmour. Christopherson went on to produce music videos for many bands and shot some of the earliest promotional photography for the Sex Pistols, but worked primarily as an electronic musician in the bands Throbbing Gristle, Psychic TV and Coil until his death in 2010.

History 
In 1968, Thorgerson and Powell were approached by their friends in Pink Floyd to design the cover for the group's second album, A Saucerful of Secrets. This led to additional work for EMI, including photos and album covers for the Pretty Things, Free, Toe Fat and the Gods. Being film and art school students, they were able to use the darkroom at the Royal College of Art, but when they completed school, they had to set up their own facilities. They built a small darkroom in Powell's bathroom, but shortly thereafter, in early 1970, rented space and built a studio located at 6 Denmark Street.

When first starting out, Powell and Thorgerson adopted their name from graffiti they found on the door to their apartment. Thorgerson said they liked the word, not only for punning on "hypnosis", but for possessing "a nice sense of contradiction, of an impossible co-existence, from Hip = new, cool, and groovy, and Gnostic, relating to ancient learning."

Hipgnosis gained major international prominence in 1973 with their cover design for Pink Floyd's The Dark Side of the Moon. The final design was one of several versions prepared for the band to choose from, but according to drummer Nick Mason, the 'prism/pyramid' design was the immediate and unanimous choice. The record itself became one of the biggest-selling and longest-charting albums of all time, and the cover has since been hailed as one of the best of all time (VH1 rated it as No. 4, in 2003). After that, the firm became highly sought-after, and did many covers for high-profile bands and artists such as Led Zeppelin, Genesis, UFO, Black Sabbath, Peter Gabriel, the Alan Parsons Project, and Yes. They also designed the cover for the original UK paperback edition of Douglas Adams' The Hitchhiker's Guide to the Galaxy (Adams would describe Thorgerson as "The best album designer in the world"), as well as the original UK hardcover edition of Norman Spinrad's Bug Jack Barron.

Peter Christopherson joined Hipgnosis as an assistant in 1974, and later became a full partner. The firm employed many assistants and other staff members over the years, including freelance designers and illustrators Richard Evans, George Hardie, and Richard Manning.

Hipgnosis did not have a set fee for designing an album cover but instead asked the artists to "pay what they thought it was worth". According to Thorgerson, this policy only occasionally backfired.

Style 

Hipgnosis' approach to album design was strongly photography-oriented, and they pioneered the use of many innovative visual and packaging techniques. In particular, Thorgerson and Powell's surreal, elaborately manipulated photos (utilizing darkroom tricks, multiple exposures, airbrush retouching, and mechanical cut-and-paste techniques) were a film-based forerunner of what would, much later, be called photoshopping. Hipgnosis mainly used Hasselblad medium format cameras for their work, the square film format being especially suited to album cover imagery.

Hipgnosis covers were noted for their quirky humour, such as the cover for the Pink Floyd double-LP compilation A Nice Pair, which featured an array of visual puns. Another example was the album There's the Rub for Wishbone Ash using a picture of cricketer and ball.

Such humour once angered Jimmy Page of Led Zeppelin, when Hipgnosis created a visual pun based on "(tennis) racquet"/"(noise) racket" for the album Houses of the Holy. Hipgnosis almost lost Led Zeppelin as a client as a result.

Another trademark was that many of their cover photos visually related to the album's lyrics, often depicting puns or double meanings of words in the album title. Since both Powell and Thorgerson were film students, they often used models and staged the photos in a highly theatrical manner. Hipgnosis covers rarely featured artists' photos on the outside, and most were in a gatefold cover format to provide ample space for their imagery.

Many of Hipgnosis' covers also featured pen and ink logos and illustrations designed to appear high-tech (often by graphic designer George Hardie), stickers, fancy inner sleeves, and other packaging bonuses. One of the extras created by Hipgnosis was the specially printed inner sleeve for Led Zeppelin's In Through the Out Door LP, which was black and white but turned to colour when dampened with water (tying in with the main cover's photographic theme).

Work

References

External links 
 [ AllMusic album credits]
 
 Unofficial Hipgnosis website

Graphic design studios
Pink Floyd
Album-cover and concert-poster artists
Design companies established in 1968
Design companies disestablished in 1983
1968 establishments in England
1983 disestablishments in England